Paracroton is a genus of flowering plants in the Euphorbiaceae first described as a genus in  1859. It is native to South and Southeast Asia, as well as New Guinea.

Species
 Paracroton integrifolius (Airy Shaw) N.P.Balakr. & Chakr. - Kerala, Tamil Nadu
 Paracroton pendulus (Hassk.) Miq. - India, Sri Lanka, Myanmar, Thailand, Malaysia, Borneo, Sumatra, Philippines 
 Paracroton sterrhopodus (Airy Shaw) Radcl.-Sm. & Govaerts - W New Guinea
 Paracroton zeylanicus (Müll.Arg.) N.P.Balakr. & Chakr. - Sri Lanka

References

Crotoneae
Euphorbiaceae genera